Three Sixty West is a  skyscraper complex in Mumbai, Maharashtra, India. It comprises two towers, joined at ground level by a podium. Tower A is a hotel, and Private residences are located in Tower B. The podium accommodates amenities such as restaurants and Ballrooms.

The project was designed by Kohn Pedersen Fox. The structural consultant is LERA (Leslie E. Robertson Associates). and the main Contractor is Samsung C&T. Hotel interiors are done by Tony Chi and Associates. Residents' amenities are designed by Populous.

The project was developed under Oasis Realty, a joint venture between Sahana and Oberoi Realty. In May 2014, Oberoi Realty announced The Ritz-Carlton as the hospitality partner for the project. The Ritz-Carlton Mumbai occupies Tower A, and the private residences in Tower B have access to certain services from the hotel.

The project was formally named Three Sixty West in 2015.

See also
List of tallest buildings in Mumbai
List of tallest buildings in India
List of tallest buildings and structures in the Indian subcontinent
List of tallest buildings in Asia
List of tallest residential buildings
List of tallest buildings in different cities in India

References

Buildings and structures under construction in India
Skyscraper hotels in Mumbai
Residential skyscrapers in Mumbai